The Chandigarh–Sahnewal line (also referred to as the Chandigarh–Ludhiana line) is a railway line connecting  and , the latter in the Indian state] of the Punjab. The line is under the administrative jurisdiction of Northern Railway.

History
The 112 km-long project for linking  and Ludhiana directly was completed in three phases. The first phase linking Chandigarh and New Morinda on the Sirhind–Nangal line was opened in September 2006. The second phase for the addition of third line between Sahnewal and Ludhiana on the Ambala–Attari line was completed in November 2012. The third phase linking New Morinda with Ludhiana was completed in April 2013.

Electrification
The Chandigarh–Ludhiana sector is electrified. As per the Central Organisation for Railway Electrification, as on 1.4.2012, 43 km had been completed and 69 km were left.

Passenger movement
Chandigarh is the only station on this line which is amongst the top hundred booking stations of Indian Railway.

Railway reorganisation
Northern Railway was formed in 1952 with a portion of East Indian Railway Company west of Mughalsarai, Jodhpur Railway, Bikaner Railway and Eastern Punjab Railway.

Trains
The 12241/12242 Amritsar–Chandigarh Superfast Express was introduced on the new line in 2013.
14504 Shri Mata Vaishno Devi Katra–Kalka Express
12412 Amritsar–Chandigarh Intercity Express

References

External links

5 ft 6 in gauge railways in India
Rail transport in Punjab, India

Railway lines opened in 2013
Rail transport in Chandigarh
2013 establishments in India
Transport in Chandigarh